Players and pairs who neither have high enough rankings nor receive wild cards may participate in a qualifying tournament held one week before the annual Wimbledon Tennis Championships.

Seeds

  Jonas Björkman (first round)
  Kenny Thorne (second round)
  Chris Pridham (second round)
  Jörn Renzenbrink (first round)
  Mauricio Hadad (first round)
  Patrick Baur (qualifying competition)
  Andrew Sznajder (qualifying competition)
  Gilad Bloom (first round)
  Christian Saceanu (qualifying competition)
  Chris Garner (first round)
  Laurence Tieleman (qualified)
  Greg Rusedski (qualified)
  David Witt (qualifying competition)
  Dirk Dier (second round)
  Dave Randall (qualified)
  Maurice Ruah (first round)
  Jean-Philippe Fleurian (first round)
  Fernando Roese (first round)
  Pat Rafter (qualified)
  Sébastien Lareau (qualified)
  Tomas Nydahl (qualifying competition)
  Dimitri Poliakov (second round)
  David Nainkin (qualified)
  Jan Apell (second round)
  Steve Bryan (qualified)
  Lan Bale (first round)
  Roger Smith (first round)
  Simon Youl (qualified)
  Leander Paes (first round)
  Danilo Marcelino (first round)
  Gary Muller (qualifying competition)
  Mark Knowles (qualifying competition)

Qualifiers

  Grant Doyle
  Brian Joelson
  Brian Devening
  Fernon Wibier
  Todd Nelson
  Simon Youl
  Peter Moraing
  Steve Bryan
  David Nainkin
  Mark Keil
  Laurence Tieleman
  Greg Rusedski
  Sébastien Lareau
  Pat Rafter
  Dave Randall
  Paul Kilderry

Qualifying draw

First qualifier

Second qualifier

Third qualifier

Fourth qualifier

Fifth qualifier

Sixth qualifier

Seventh qualifier

Eighth qualifier

Ninth qualifier

Tenth qualifier

Eleventh qualifier

Twelfth qualifier

Thirteenth qualifier

Fourteenth qualifier

Fifteenth qualifier

Sixteenth qualifier

External links

 1993 Wimbledon Championships – Men's draws and results at the International Tennis Federation

Men's Singles Qualifying
Wimbledon Championship by year – Men's singles qualifying